Thomas Turner (born August 8, 1952) is an American politician who served as a Republican member of the Kentucky House of Representatives for the 85th district from 1997 to 2021.

Elections
1996 Turner won the four-way 1996 Republican primary and was unopposed for the November 5, 1996 general election.
1998 Turner was unopposed for both the 1998 Republican primary and the November 3, 1998 general election.
2000 Turner was unopposed for both the 2000 Republican primary and the November 7, 2000 general election, winning with 10,984 votes.
2002 Turner was unopposed for both the 2002 Republican primary and the November 5, 2002 general election, winning with 7,512 votes.
2004 Turner was unopposed for both the 2004 Republican primary and the November 2, 2004 general election, winning with 13,292 votes.
2006 Turner was challenged in the 2006 Republican primary, winning with 7,412 votes (80.0%) and was unopposed for the November 7, 2006 general election, winning with 10,262 votes.
2008 Turner was unopposed for both the 2008 Republican primary and the November 4, 2008 general election, winning with 14,887 votes.
2010 Turner was challenged in the May 18, 2010 Republican primary, winning with 7,310 votes (73.5%) and was unopposed for the November 2, 2010 general election, winning with 11,710 votes.
2012 Turner was unopposed for both the May 22, 2012 Republican primary and the November 6, 2012 general election, winning with 15,792 votes.
2018 Turner was challenged by Mona Hampton Eldrige, the first challenge he has faced in more than a decade.

Legislative history
Representative Turner has distinguished himself by his lack of impact, failing to introduce a single piece of stand-alone legislation during his 20-year tenure in the legislature.

Animal protection

In 2015, Turner came under fire for tacking an amendment requiring a health insurance policy, pursuant to the Affordable Care Act, on to KY HB 177, a bill designed to assure that animals in Kentucky have adequate shelter. Kentucky has been rated the worst state for animal protection for seven years in a row, and is projected to "win" this rating for year eight.

References

External links
Official page at the Kentucky general Assembly

Thomas Turner at Ballotpedia
Tommy Turner at OpenSecrets

Place of birth missing (living people)
1952 births
Living people
Republican Party members of the Kentucky House of Representatives
People from Somerset, Kentucky
21st-century American politicians